Elisa Pérez Walker (1930 – 4 September 2012), better known by the pseudonym Elisa Serrana, was a Chilean feminist, teacher, and novelist. She was a member of her country's Generation of '50, which also included , Elena Aldunate, Mercedes Valdivieso, and Matilde Ladrón de Guevara.

Biography
Elisa Pérez Walker was born into a family of landowners. Her mother was Blanca Walker Larraín and her father was Santiago Pérez Peña, a civil engineer, farmer, deputy for Caupolicán Department (1924; 1926–1930), Minister of Justice (1932), mayor of Magallanes (1937), and president of the Chilean Golf Federation (1949–1951).

About them she would say:

She then studied pedagogy in religion at the Pontifical Catholic University of Chile.

At age 19 she married , an essayist 20 years her elder, the former Minister of Agriculture (1940), a future member of the Academia Chilena de la Lengua (1970), and columnist for El Mercurio. The couple had five daughters, among them writer Marcela Serrano, of whom it was observed "you can perceive a certain continuity, a literary-filial relationship that seems to go hand in hand with the generational change that took place between Elisa Serrana and her daughter." Their daughter  is a historian.

In 1972 the Popular Unity government expropriated the Los Remolinos family farm in Ñuble, which according to her daughter Margarita "was an emotional tragedy" for the family. Despite this, they were not supporters of the military coup led by General Augusto Pinochet against Salvador Allende the following year.

Elisa Serrana worked at the  publishing house from 1962 to 1976, becoming director of the Disney children's magazine department. She was a teacher at Saint George's College in Santiago.

Described by her daughters Paula and Margarita as "extremely Catholic," the writer "never stopped believing or praying."

Literary career
Elisa Serrana's first creative efforts were, she considered, "horrible verses, which converged in a shoebox as a wonderful secret." She later wrote her first novel, which she later described as "320 pages of fiction with some real touches and features of people" about her family, which was never released "because the book is bad." She published a poetry collection, Homenaje al miedo, in 1950.

Her first stories were brought to writer Eugenio González Rojas, who commented on and corrected them. She began to publish articles and short stories in various newspapers and magazines in 1955. She made a name for herself as a writer in 1960, when her first novel Las tres caras de un sello was published to critical success.

In the literary field, much of her work concerned the role of bourgeois women in Chile. Four novels followed: Chilena, casada, sin profesión, an exhibit of the effects of feminism in Chilean society of the 1920s; Una; En blanco y negro; and A cuál de ellas quiere usted: "mandandirumdirunda", which received a distinction in the 1985 María Luisa Bombal Contest.

In the opinion of Michelle Prain Brice, Serrana portrayed

The stroke she suffered in 1987 forced her to abandon literary production, without realizing her dream of writing what she considered her masterpiece: "the story of three generations, her mother's, hers, and their daughters. The three with their dramas and virtues and with their difficulties of adaptation."

Novels
 Las tres caras de un sello, Editorial Zig-Zag, Santiago, 1960,  (reissued: 1961, 1964) 
 Chilena, casada, sin profesión, Zig-Zag, Santiago, 1963 (reissued: 1964, 1965, 1967, 1974; Andrés Bello 2002, 2003)
 Una, Zig-Zag, Santiago, 1964,  (reissued: 1965, 1973)
 En blanco y negro Zig-Zag, Santiago, 1968 (reissued: Plaza & Janés, 2005)
 A cuál de ellas quiere usted: "mandandirumdirunda", Editorial Andrés Bello, Santiago, 1985
 Obras selectas, Andrés Bello, Santiago, 2002,

References

External links
 Elisa Serrana at Memoria Chilena

1930 births
2012 deaths
20th-century Chilean women writers
20th-century Chilean novelists
Chilean women novelists
21st-century Chilean novelists
Writers from Santiago
Chilean feminist writers
Catholic feminists
Chilean Roman Catholics
21st-century Chilean women writers